James Graeme Sinclair (born 1 July 1957) is a Scottish former footballer, who played for Dumbarton, Celtic, Manchester City and St Mirren. Sinclair man-marked Johan Cruyff when Celtic beat Ajax in a 1982–83 European Cup tie. Sinclair won a Scottish League Cup winner's medal in December 1982 when he played in the Celtic side that won 2-1 in the final against Rangers.  In November 1984 his former Celtic manager Billy McNeill signed him on loan for Manchester City. He made his debut in a 4–1 League Cup defeat at Chelsea, but made just one league appearance, against Portsmouth, in which he was substituted at half-time.

References

External links

Living people
Scottish footballers
Association football fullbacks
Dumbarton F.C. players
Celtic F.C. players
Manchester City F.C. players
St Mirren F.C. players
Scottish Football League players
English Football League players
Footballers from Paisley, Renfrewshire
Scottish Football League representative players
1957 births
Scotland under-21 international footballers